Mohd. Amri bin Yahyah , nicknamed "Wak Am" (born 21 January 1981) is a Malaysian professional footballer who plays for Sabah. He has also represented the Malaysian national team. Amri plays mainly as a forward but can also play as an attacking midfielder or as a winger.

Amri spent most of his career at Selangor F.C. (formerly known as F.A. Selangor) from 2001 until 2013. He had a stint with Johor Darul Ta'zim from 2014 until 2016 before moving to Melaka United in December 2016. Amri returned to Selangor F.C. during the mid-season transfer window in May 2017.

Prolific marksman Amri scored his 100th career goal in Selangor F.C. vs Perak on 19 June 2018 in style.

Club career

F.A. Selangor
Born in Tanjung Karang, Selangor, Amri signed a contract with F.A. Selangor (Selangor F.C.) in 2001 and helped the outfit to the treble (Premier League Malaysia, Malaysian FA Cup and Malaysia Cup) in 2005.

Amri became a cult hero when he scored a golden goal against Sabah in the 2002 Malaysia Cup Final. He was made the F.A. Selangor team captain in the 2009 Malaysia Super League campaign.

Amri is a versatile player, having played in a number of different positions including as a defender, winger, defensive and attacking midfielder, and striker.

Johor Darul Ta'zim
Amri completed his transfer to Johor Darul Ta'zim for 2014 season of Malaysia Super League, with a monthly salary reported to be around RM 85,000. Johor Darul Ta'zim became the Malaysian Super League champions, narrowly overtaking Amri's former club F.A. Selangor by a mere 3 points on the last day of the league.

Even after his transfer, Amri remained popular with the F.A. Selangor fans until his ultimate faux pas - celebrating a goal against Selangor by dancing in full view of its supporters. It was rumoured that he did this to spite the Football Association of Selangor. F.A. Selangor went on to win the game 4–1. He later apologised, which F.A. Selangor fans spurned, as he was booed upon his return to Shah Alam Stadium to face F.A. Selangor. Some furious supporters even tossed bottles at him when he came over to the F.A. Selangor section to applaud them. Amri reportedly shed tears after that insult. However, he remains hugely popular with Malaysian fans in general.

Melaka United
On 16 December 2016, Amri signed a one-year contract with newly promoted club Melaka United for an undisclosed fee after his contract with Johor Darul Ta'zim expired. On 21 February 2017, Amri made his debut for Melaka United in a 2–0 win over Kelantan playing for 90 minutes. On 14 February 2017, Amri scored a winning goal for his side in Malaysia FA Cup campaign over PKNS.

Return to F.A. Selangor
In May 2017, Melaka United announced that Amri Yahyah was returning to his former club F.A. Selangor in the mid-season transfer window. Amri made his league debut in 0–2 defeat against Pahang on 24 May 2017. Amri scored his league goal on 22 July 2017 in a 1–0 win over Kelantan. His second league goal came from 2–1 win over Johor Darul Ta'zim on 5 August 2017.

Amri Yahyah departed F.A. Selangor at the end of the 2019 season.

Sarawak United F.C.
At the end of January 2020, Amri joined the Sarawak United F.C. for the start of Malaysia League 2020 season.

Sabah F.C.
During the 2021 transfer window, Amri, now 40, signed for Sabah F.C. in 18 February 2021. It makes the twentieth seasons for Amri in the domestic competition.

In 25 April 2022, during the Malaysian Super League match against Kedah Darul Aman F.C., Amri set a league record by scoring a hattrick. Now aged 41, the former international started the game after injury to striker-in-chief Neto Pessoa and he  repaid the faith with a hattrick in the second half. Amri rifled home the first in the 51st minute and added his second with an expertly taken shot from a tight angle 10 minutes later. The veteran striker completed his hattrick with another breathtaking effort by chipping the ball beyond the reach of KDA FC goalkeeper Ifwat Akmal in the 72nd minute. Coach Ong Kim Swee, said to reporters that Amri's hattrick at the age of 41 will be difficult to emulate.

International career
The right-footed player represented Malaysia in the 2003 Sea Games in Hanoi, Vietnam, the Afro-Asian Games Hyderabad, India in October 2003, and also in the 2004 Tiger Cup helping Malaysia to finish third.

His following grew significantly after scoring a brace for Malaysia Selection in a pre-season exhibition match on 18 July 2009, against English champions Manchester United. The latter ran out 3–2 winners.

In November 2010, Amri was called up to the Malaysian national squad by coach K. Rajagopal for the 2010 AFF Suzuki Cup. Amri scored twice against Laos to secure a 5–1 win. Malaysia went on to win the 2010 AFF Suzuki Cup title for the first time.

In July 2011, Amri was called up to represent Malaysia Selection against Chelsea.

On 10 August 2013, Amri once again lived up to his reputation of scoring against top foreign clubs by scoring the only Malaysian goal in a 3–1 loss to FC Barcelona during their 2013 Asia Tour.

Career statistics

Club

International

Scores and results list Malaysia's goal tally first.

Honours

Club
Selangor FA
 Malaysia Super League: 2009, 2010
 Malaysia FA Cup: 2001, 2005, 2009
 Malaysia Cup: 2002, 2005
 Piala Sumbangsih: 2002, 2009, 2010
 Malaysia Premier League: 2005

Johor Darul Takzim
 Malaysia Super League: 2014, 2015, 2016
 Malaysia FA Cup: 2016
 Piala Sumbangsih: 2015, 2016
 AFC Cup: 2015

International
Malaysia
 AFF Championship: 2010
AFF Championship: Runner-up: 2014

Individual
 FAM Football Awards Best Midfielder: 2009 
 FAM Football Awards Best Striker: 2015

Records 
 Selangor all-time top appearances: 437
 The oldest goalscorer in Malaysia Super League (41 years old)
 The oldest player to score hattrick in Malaysia football leagues (41 years old)

References

External links
 

1981 births
Living people
Malaysian footballers
Malaysian people of Malay descent
Malaysian people of Javanese descent
Malaysia international footballers
Association football forwards
People from Selangor
Selangor FA players
Johor Darul Ta'zim F.C. players
Malaysia Super League players
Melaka United F.C. players
Sarawak United FC players
Sabah F.C. (Malaysia) players
AFC Cup winning players